Terich Mir (also spelled Terichmir and Turch Mir) is the highest mountain of the Hindu Kush range, and the highest mountain in the world outside of the Himalayas–Karakoram range, at  above sea level. It is located in the Chitral District of Khyber Pakhtunkhwa, Pakistan. 

It’s the 33rd highest peak in the world. The first recorded ascent of the mountain was on 21 July 1950 by a Norwegian expedition consisting of Arne Næss, P. Kvernberg, H. Berg, and Tony Streather, depicted in the documentary film Tirich Mir til topps. Tirich Mir overlooks the town of Chitral, and can be easily seen from the main bazaar. It is the closest mountain to Aconcagua which is higher than Aconcagua, and thus determines Aconcagua's topographic isolation.

It is the highest mountain in the province of Khyber Pukhtunkhwa. In fact, it’s the highest mountain of Pakistan outside the Gilgit Baltistan region. 

The last village situated in Chitral District before the mountain begins is the village of Tirich. This valley begins at Soorwaht, where Tirich River meets Torkhow River from the west, up to Shagrom—the last permanent settlement of the valley. From that point onwards, there are summertime grazing pastures and shepherd huts leading up to the snout of the lower Tirich glacier, which goes further up to Tirich Concordia, where glaciers from seven sub-valleys slide down and join at the Concordia glacial confluence.

It is believed the origin of the name Tirich Mir is "King of Tirich" as Tirich is the name of a side valley of the Mulkhow valley of Chitral which leads up to Tirich Mir. An alternative etymology derives this name from the Wakhi language. In Wakhi, trich means shadow or darkness and mir means king, so Tirich Mir means king of darkness. It could have gotten this name as it creates long shadows on the Wakhan side of its face.

Climate

On this specific altitude ( asl) we find moderately cold winters and cool summers generally above freezing.

Folklore
According to the polytheist Kalash people who live nearby, this mountain is the domain of the goddess Krumai. She appears in the form of a wild goat, and she is associated with childbirth. In one legend, she disturbed the other gods, and was chased by Imra, who threw her into a fast river. Krumai jumped up the river and ran up the cliff, causing the cliff's shape with her hooves. She revealed her true form and prepared a feast for the other gods, and they accepted her into their pantheon.

The Chitrali people, who are Muslim, instead believe that this mountain is the home of fairies and their fortress. No one may climb it, as doing so will bring death to the trespasser. These mountain fairies are known as "Bohtan Doyak", the "stone throwers".

See also 
 Akhlan Terich
 Khyber Pakhtunkhwa
 List of mountains in Pakistan
 List of highest mountains on Earth
 List of Ultras of the Karakoram and Hindu Kush

References

Books 

 Keay, John,  "The Gilgit Game":  The Explorers of the Western Himalayas, 1865-95, Oxford University Press, 1985, 
 Robertson, Sir George Scott, The Kafirs of the Hindukush, Oxford University Press, (1896, OUP edition 1986),

External links 

 Tirich Mir on SummitPost

Chitral District
Mountains of Khyber Pakhtunkhwa
Mountains of Pakistan
Mountains of the Hindu Kush
Seven-thousanders of the Hindu Kush